The Welaka State Forest is in the U.S. state of Florida. The  forest is located in North Central Florida, upstream from Welaka on the eastern bank of the St. Johns River.  Welaka State Forest is adjacent to the Mount Royal site discussed by William Bartram in chapter 4 of Bartram's Travels.

Welaka State Forest is located along Putnam County Road 309 between two portions of the Welaka National Fish Hatchery. The Beecher Unit which is located in Fruitland and the Welaka Unit located in Welaka.

See also
List of Florida state forests
List of Florida state parks

References

External links

 Welaka State Forest: Florida Forest Service - FDACS

Florida state forests
Protected areas of Putnam County, Florida